The WPA Asian Nine-ball Tour (also known as the Guinness Asian 9-Ball Tour or San Miguel Asian 9-Ball Tour for sponsorship reasons) was an annual series of nine-ball pool tournaments around East and Southeast Asia. The tour began in 2003, and is sanctioned by the World Pool-Billiard Association.

From 2003 to 2005, each leg had a field of 32 players and the total purse was US$50,000. In 2006, the number of players was reduced to 24 and total purse decreased to $40,000.

The winner in each leg of the tour receives a cash prize and points for the ranking for the yearly WPA World Nine-ball Championship.

San Miguel Beer and 188BET were the sponsor of the tournament prior to 2007, when this slot was taken over by Guinness.

Format
In each leg, the 24 players are divided into 8 groups having 3 players each. The players in a particular group play in round-robin where the one who's on top moves into the quarter finals.

From the group stages to the quarter finals, the matchers are race to 9. The semis and final matches are race to 11. Also in the semi-finals and finals, a player must win by at least 2 racks. This means he can 11–9. If the other player manages to makes 10-10, the match goes into extra racks, one of them will have to make 12-10 or 13–11 to win. The maximum extension is up to 13, so it is also a win for a player to score 13–12.

A shot clock of 45 seconds is used with one extension for each player per rack. Failing to shoot within the clock will fine the player US$50.

The "alternating " rule is enforced.

Starting in 2008, the final will be a race to 11 racks affair and the "at least 2 racks to win" rule has been scrapped.

Tournament results

San Miguel era

Guinness era

Trivia
 There were supposed to be 5 legs in 2003. But the other 3 were cancelled because of the SARS outbreak.
 All those who won a leg in the tour each won $10,000 for 1st place. However, Efren Reyes earned $20,000 for winning the Manila leg in 2003.

External links
 San Miguel Asian Nine-ball Tour official site
 Guinness Asian Nine-ball Tour official site

Pool tours and series